Playhouse Video (formerly known as CBS/Fox Children’s Video) was a sub-label of CBS/Fox Video operating from 1983 to 1989. The company was responsible for release of some older, low-quality Fox films, in addition to family films, animated films, documentaries and other materials produced by Fox. The company was shut down in 1989, and years later, the company was revived as Fox Family Fun, a division of 20th Century Fox Home Entertainment, which is now known as 20th Century Studios Home Entertainment. The Fox Family Fun division is a branding on kids' releases.

History
The company was launched in 1983 by CBS/Fox Video. The company was shut down in 1989, and years later, the company was revived as Fox Family Fun, a division of 20th Century Fox Home Entertainment, which is now known as 20th Century Studios Home Entertainment.

Short-lived predecessor
The company was formerly known as CBS/Fox Children’s Video, which was a short-lived kids and family unit of CBS/Fox Video that was used for one year before becoming Playhouse Video a year later. The CBS/Fox Children’s Video brand was only used in 1984.

Defunct companies based in New York City
American companies established in 1983
American companies disestablished in 1989
1983 establishments in New York City
1989 disestablishments in New York (state)
Home video companies established in 1983
Home video companies disestablished in 1989